FCBB may refer to:

Buildings and structures 
 Maya-Maya Airport  is an airport located in Brazzaville, the capital of the Republic of the Congo.

Sports 
 FC Bayern Munich (basketball) (also abbreviated as FC Bayern (basketball) or FCBB) is a German professional team.